Nepenthes boschiana (after Johannes van den Bosch), or Bosch's pitcher-plant, is a tropical pitcher plant endemic to Borneo. It is most closely allied to N. faizaliana. Nepenthes borneensis is considered a synonym of this species. Nepenthes boschiana has no known natural hybrids. No valid forms or varieties have been described. Nepenthes boschiana belongs to the loosely defined "N. maxima complex", which also includes, among other species, N. chaniana, N. epiphytica, N. eymae, N. faizaliana, N. fusca, N. klossii, N. maxima, N. platychila, N. stenophylla, and N. vogelii.

The species was formally described by Pieter Willem Korthals in his 1839 monograph, "Over het geslacht Nepenthes". B. H. Danser, in his 1928 monograph "The Nepenthaceae of the Netherlands Indies", wrote the following:

Korthals states the natives who accompanied him on Mt. Sakoembang gathered the not yet opened pitchers, as the water which they contained was a medicament against inflammation of the eyes, whereas others cut the opened pitchers as playthings for their children. He describes the habitat as sterile, open and stony. The vernacular name 'daoen sompitan' is translated by him as blow-pipe-leaf; according to dictionaries this is right.

Infraspecific taxa
Nepenthes boschiana var. lowii Hook.f. (1873) [=N. stenophylla]
Nepenthes boschiana var. sumatrana Miq. (1858) [=N. sumatrana]

References

Further reading

 Adam, J.H. & C.C. Wilcock 1989. A new Nepenthes from Gunong Besar, Kalimantan Selatan, Borneo. The Gardens' Bulletin Singapore 42(1): 25–28.
 Adam, J.H., C.C. Wilcock & M.D. Swaine 1992. The ecology and distribution of Bornean Nepenthes. Journal of Tropical Forest Science 5(1): 13–25.
 Bauer, U., C.J. Clemente, T. Renner & W. Federle 2012. Form follows function: morphological diversification and alternative trapping strategies in carnivorous Nepenthes pitcher plants. Journal of Evolutionary Biology 25(1): 90–102. 
  Blume, C.L. 1852. Ord. Nepenthaceae. In: Museum Botanicum Lugduno-Batavum, sive stirpium exoticarum novarum vel minus cognitarum ex vivis aut siccis brevis expositio. Tom. II. Nr. 1. E.J. Brill, Lugduni-Batavorum. pp. 5–10.
 Clarke, C.M. 2006. Introduction. In: Danser, B.H. The Nepenthaceae of the Netherlands Indies. Natural History Publications (Borneo), Kota Kinabalu. pp. 1–15.
 Hooker, J.D. 1859. XXXV. On the origin and development of the pitchers of Nepenthes, with an account of some new Bornean plants of that genus. The Transactions of the Linnean Society of London 22(4): 415–424. 
 McPherson, S.R. & A. Robinson 2012. Field Guide to the Pitcher Plants of Borneo. Redfern Natural History Productions, Poole.
 Meimberg, H., A. Wistuba, P. Dittrich & G. Heubl 2001. Molecular phylogeny of Nepenthaceae based on cladistic analysis of plastid trnK intron sequence data. Plant Biology 3(2): 164–175. 
  Meimberg, H. 2002. Molekular-systematische Untersuchungen an den Familien Nepenthaceae und Ancistrocladaceae sowie verwandter Taxa aus der Unterklasse Caryophyllidae s. l.. Ph.D. thesis, Ludwig Maximilian University of Munich, Munich. 
 Meimberg, H. & G. Heubl 2006. Introduction of a nuclear marker for phylogenetic analysis of Nepenthaceae. Plant Biology 8(6): 831–840. 
 Meimberg, H., S. Thalhammer, A. Brachmann & G. Heubl 2006. Comparative analysis of a translocated copy of the trnK intron in carnivorous family Nepenthaceae. Molecular Phylogenetics and Evolution 39(2): 478–490. 
 Mey, F.S. 2014. Joined lecture on carnivorous plants of Borneo with Stewart McPherson. Strange Fruits: A Garden's Chronicle, February 21, 2014.
 Renner, T. & C.D. Specht 2011. A sticky situation: assessing adaptations for plant carnivory in the Caryophyllales by means of stochastic character mapping. International Journal of Plant Sciences 172(7): 889–901. 
  Teysmann, M.J.E. 1859. Énumération des plantes envoyées de Java au jardin botanique de l'Université de Leide. Annales d'horticulture et de botanique, ou Flore des jardins du royaume des Pays-Bas, et histoire des plantes cultivées les plus intéressantes des possessions néerlandaises aux Indes orientales, de l'Amérique et du Japon 2: 133–142.

External links

Photographs of N. boschiana at the Carnivorous Plant Photofinder

Carnivorous plants of Asia
boschiana
Medicinal plants
Plants described in 1839
Endangered plants